Brigadier General Andrés Ignacio Menéndez (1 February 1879–7 June 1962) was born in Santa Ana, El Salvador.

He served as President of El Salvador from 29 August 1934 to 1 March 1935 and again from 9 May to 20 October 1944. He was overthrown in October 1944 by a military coup led by Col. Osmín Aguirre y Salinas and exiled to Guatemala.

Career

Ignacio gradually rose through the ranks in the Salvadoran military, becoming second lieutenant on 18 October 1898, lieutenant on 24 March 1904, captain on 1 August 1906, captain mayor on 24 May, 1907, lieutenant colonel on 20 May 1911, colonel on 21 May 1915, and brigadier general on 10 August 1920.

Civil unrest broke out following the overthrow of President Hernandez. In response, Melendez declared amnesty for everyone who was part of the unrest, and thus began a national transition to democracy.

References 

1879 births
1962 deaths
People from Santa Ana, El Salvador
People of Asturian descent
Presidents of El Salvador
Defence ministers of El Salvador
Salvadoran military personnel
World War II political leaders
Leaders ousted by a coup
Salvadoran exiles
Salvadoran expatriates in Guatemala